The first Rudd ministry (Labor) was the 64th ministry of the Government of Australia. It was led by the country's 26th Prime Minister, Kevin Rudd. The first Rudd ministry succeeded the Fourth Howard Ministry, which dissolved on 3 December 2007 following the federal election that took place on 24 November which saw Labor defeat John Howard's Liberal–National Coalition. The ministry was replaced by the First Gillard Ministry on 24 June 2010 following the resignation of Rudd as Prime Minister after a successful leadership challenge by Julia Gillard.

Cabinet

Outer ministry

Parliamentary Secretaries

Changes to the Ministry

Changes from Rudd shadow ministry
Prior to Labor's election to government, in line with long-standing parliamentary convention, Rudd led a shadow cabinet consisting of opposition spokespeople on a range of portfolios. Following the election, some changes were made to this configuration before the Ministry was sworn in.

Peter Garrett was sworn in as Minister for the Environment, Heritage and the Arts, but his shadow portfolio had included Climate Change and Water, which went to Senator Penny Wong. Three previous shadow ministers — Arch Bevis, Kate Lundy and Kerry O'Brien — were relegated to the back bench, while three others — Jan McLucas, Laurie Ferguson and Bob McMullan — were only sworn in as parliamentary secretaries.

Some portfolio responsibilities changed due to Julia Gillard's appointment as Minister for Education. Tanya Plibersek's responsibilities were reduced, with Human Services transferring to Joe Ludwig, the shadow Attorney-General. Robert McClelland became Attorney-General, while Stephen Smith became Minister for Foreign Affairs in lieu of Education.

While the former Shadow Minister for Finance Lindsay Tanner retained his portfolio, the ministry and department underwent a name change to Finance and Deregulation.

February 2009 changes
On 25 February 2009, Prime Minister Kevin Rudd announced a reshuffle of his Parliamentary Secretaries (the lowest ministerial rank), following the resignation of John Murphy. The reshuffle also saw the appointment of Senator Mark Arbib as Parliamentary Secretary for Government Service Delivery. Bill Shorten added Victorian Bushfire Reconstruction to his responsibilities of Disabilities and Children's Services.

June 2009 reshuffle
On 9 June 2009, a significant reshuffle of the ministry took place. It was prompted by Defence Minister Joel Fitzgibbon's resignation from cabinet after a series of embarrassing events and revelations harmed his reputation, along with a generally held view that his relationship with his department had irretrievably broken down. The changes were announced by Rudd on 5 June 2009. Labor veteran Senator John Faulkner, previously Special Minister for State and responsible for the government's electoral reform package, was appointed to the role. He was the first person from the Left faction of the ALP to hold the position since World War II. Other changes of note included the elevation of Greg Combet and Senator Mark Arbib from parliamentary secretaries to the Outer Ministry, and Bob Debus's retirement from the ministry. The new ministers were all sworn in on 9 June.

Other changes
On 14 December 2009, Duncan Kerr's appointment as Parliamentary Secretary for International Development Assistance was terminated following his announcement that he would retire at the next election.

On 8 March 2010, Peter Garrett's title was changed from Minister for Environment, Heritage and the Arts to Minister for Environment Protection, Heritage and the Arts. This was in response to the perceived mishandling of one of the government's stimulus programs. Several of Garrett's environmental responsibilities were transferred to Senator Penny Wong, whose title changed from Minister for Climate Change and Water to Minister for Climate Change, Energy Efficiency and Water.

On 1 April 2010 Greg Combet became Minister for Defence Materiel and Science (losing "personnel") and Minister Assisting the Minister for Climate Change and Energy Efficiency and Alan Griffin added Minister for Defence Personnel to his position as Minister for Veterans' Affairs.

On 14 April 2010 Tony Burke was appointed the inaugural Minister for Population.

See also 
 Second Rudd ministry

External links

Notes 

Ministries of Elizabeth II
Rudd 1
21st century in Australia
Ministry 1
2007 establishments in Australia
2010 disestablishments in Australia
Cabinets established in 2007
Cabinets disestablished in 2010